Richard Bryant (born September 22, 1984, in Stockton, CA) is an American actor who has appeared in the Lifetime Television series Army Wives. He played Jeremy Sherwood. He is killed in action in the fifth season while deployed overseas.

Richard moved to Charleston, SC in 1986. He attended Trident Technical College in Charleston, South Carolina. He graduated high school in 2002 from the Charleston County School of the Arts, where he was a theatre major.  Richard is currently enrolled at the College of Charleston.

He also appeared on The WB/CW show One Tree Hill.

He is multi-talented.  His talents include: guitar, bass guitar, banjo, drums, cello, and being able to play the piano by ear.  He can speak some French and Spanish. Besides acting and playing the guitar, he enjoys traveling, surfing, and being outdoors.

References

 C. Starnes.  Retrieved from www.imdb.com on 4.21.09

American male television actors
Living people
1984 births